The fifth Orbán government is the current Government of Hungary since 24 May 2022, following the 2022 parliamentary elections, led by Viktor Orbán.

Party breakdown
Party breakdown of cabinet ministers:

Members of the Cabinet

Composition
Orbán announced the members of his fifth cabinet in early May 2022.

Policy

Social policy
In 15 September 2022, The Hungarian government passed new abortion restrictions, with a Mandatory ultrasounds bill. Where women who are seeking an abortion will now be obliged to “listen to the foetal heartbeat” before they can have an abortion. This Bill was lobbyed for by the far-right Mi Hazank (Our Homeland) party.

References

2022 establishments in Hungary
Cabinets established in 2022
Hungarian governments
Government
Current governments